Caulokaempferia is a group of plants in the ginger family described as a genus in 1964. The genus is native to China, the Himalayas, and Indochina (especially Thailand).

Species 
The species in the genus include:

References

Zingiberoideae
Zingiberaceae genera